Verlorenes Wasser  (English: Lost Water) is the name given to several streams on the right-hand perimeter of the Dresden Basin in Saxony, Germany, in some cases as their proper name, in others as a colloquial name.

See also
List of rivers of Saxony

Rivers of Saxony
2VerlorenesWasser
Rivers of Germany